European Federation of National Associations of Water Services (EurEau) is the organisation represents water service providers at the European level and offers expertise on the water sector to EU bodies and decision-makers, assists policy makers at the European level in the development of directives and other legislation affecting the water sector,  and is also a network for its members to meet and exchange information and experience. 
Founded in 1975, the corporation has grown to represent drinking and waste water service providers from 31 countries across Europe. These countries pertain to EU Member States, EFTA, and the EEA.

History 
EurEau’s origins can be traced back to 1972, when a small group of water supply professionals from the original six EEC member states provided an opinion on the 4th draft directive on water meters presented by the European Commission.  Following this initial collaboration, the members decided to create an official association representing the EEC water supply companies to continue working on water legislation and meet the future requirements of the Commission, which had begun planning a directive on the quality of surface water required for the production of drinking water.  EurEau was culminated and its constitution was signed in Brussels on March 21, 1975.

Structure 
EurEau’s governance structure consists of a General Assembly (GA), and Executive Committee (ExCom), three thematic committees, five thematic joint working groups (JWG), and its secretariat. The association is governed by the GA and the ExCom. 
The General Assembly is made up of one representative from each country. 
EurEau’s three thematic committees manage cases and draft positions on issues related to their area of expertise. They are made up of experts from member organisations. Its president is Claudia Castell-Exner. 
 EU1: Drinking water: issues regarding untreated water, drinking water and associated distribution facilities.
 EU2: Waste water: issues regarding wastewater and the aquatic environment, upstream work, chemicals, and recycling.
 EU3: Economic and legal affairs: issues related to law, finance and benchmarking.

Secretariat 
The EurEau secretariat is based in Brussels.

Members 
EurEau represents 35 national drinking and waste water service providers across Europe.

References 

International water associations